Alissandru Francesco "Alex" Caldiero (born 1949) is a poet, and intermedia.

Life
Caldiero was born in the ancient town of Licodia Eubea, near Catania, Sicily, in 1949. He immigrated to the United States at age nine and was raised in Manhattan and Brooklyn, New York. He attended Queens College in Flushing, New York, and was apprenticed to the sculptor Michael Lekakis and the poet-bard Ignazio Buttitta. Caldiero has traveled through Sicily, Sardinia, Turkey, and Greece collecting proverbs, tales, and folk instruments. He is co-founder of Arba Sicula, the society for the preservation of the Sicilian language and traditions, and is the recipient of grants from the National Endowment for the Arts, Utah Performing Arts Tour, and the Best Poetry Award from the Association for Mormon Letters.

Caldiero has lived in Utah since 1980 with his wife and children shortly after converting to Mormonism, and is poet/artist-in-residence at Utah Valley University. His work has been reviewed by The Village Voice and The New York Times and he is included in A Dictionary of the Avant-Gardes.

Publications
Anthologies
 Text-Sound Texts, Richard Kostelanetz, ed., Morrow, New York, 1980.  pp. 412–417 
Exhibitions
 Performing the Book: Caldiero's "The Food that Fits the Hunger". Salt Lake Arts Center, Utah. 1995.
 After the Tree Had Fallen: Recent works and collaborations. Alex Caldiero & Frank McIntyre. Limited edition catalog. Marshall Studios.2003.

Performances
Caldiero has performed at the Utah Arts Festival, several times on National Public Radio on the Poetry Bus Tour in 2006, at The New School for Social Research, the Pritchard Art Gallery, the Salt Lake Art Center, Utah Valley University, the Kiva Koffeehouse in the Grand Staircase–Escalante National Monument, and on Brazilian TV.

His notable performance of Allen Ginsberg's "Howl" on the 50th anniversary its first reading drew a record poetry crowd at a local book store.

Recently, Caldiero has performed together with various members of Theta Naught, an ensemble that describes their music as "psychodelicious music". Caldiero intones his poetry while the band plays.

Films and documentaries
 Plan 10 from Outer Space (1994, directed by Trent Harris)
 Chloes Blanket 1996, (directed by Lory Smith)
 This Divided State 2005, (directed by Steven Greenstreet)
 The Mormons Part I 2007 (PBS documentary)
 The Sonosopher: Alex Caldiero in Life...in Sound" 2010, by Torben Bernhard and Travis Low)

Audio/video
Videotapes
 Sandscycles, meditation video (sound track/performance). With choreography and Earth Spirit Process by Maida Rust Withers. Produced by Verabel Cluff, 1992.
 The Journey Two Steps Long, language performance works. Produced by Brandon Kiggins, University of Utah, 1993.
 Words: Exterior/Interior, language acts. Produced by Steve W. Olpin. 1999.

Audio tapes / CDs
 Dream Tracts, a transenvironmental performance. Audiotape. Produced by Scott Carrier, 1992.
 Ensphered, transenvironment1. Audiotape. Produced by Scott Carrier. 1993.
 Illegible Tattoos, words/voice/drum. CD. Produced and performed by Alex Caldiero. 1998.
 Sphota Probe. Sonosophical/text works. CD. Produced by Mike Collins. 1999.
 Pieces in Places: Transenvironmental performances. CD. 2002.
 From Sound Mind, acts of language. CD. 2003.
 Sound Weave, word-music album with music by Theta Nought. CD. Differential Records. 2006.
 Na Lacrima'', audiofile

References

External links
 PRX
 Poetry Month: 'Poetry is Wanted Here'
 The Sonosopher

1949 births
American male poets
American poets
Converts to Mormonism
Italian emigrants to the United States
Italian Latter Day Saints
Latter Day Saint poets
Living people
Utah Valley University faculty
Latter Day Saints from Utah